John Thomas Nolan (died 1948) was an Irish politician and farmer. He was first elected to Dáil Éireann as a Cumann na nGaedheal Teachta Dála (TD) for the Limerick constituency at the 1923 general election. He lost his seat at the June 1927 general election, but was re-elected at the September 1927 general election. He lost his seat again at the 1932 general election, and was an unsuccessful candidate at the 1933 general election.

References

Year of birth missing
1948 deaths
Cumann na nGaedheal TDs
Members of the 4th Dáil
Members of the 6th Dáil
Politicians from County Limerick
Irish farmers